The Point Roberts Light is an aid to navigation located in Point Roberts, Whatcom County, Washington State, United States. The skeletal structure overlooks the Strait of Georgia from the end of a peninsula extending southward from Delta, British Columbia, Canada, across the 49th parallel into the U.S. It is part of Lighthouse Marine Park, a  recreational area operated by Whatcom County Parks and Recreation.

In 1908, the federal government bought  at the end of the peninsula for a light station. A true lighthouse was never built and the land was transferred to Whatcom County for use as a county park. In 2000, the Point Roberts Lighthouse Society was formed with the purpose of building a proper lighthouse on the point. According to a 2014 presentation to the Whatcom County Parks and Recreation Committee, the society has completed architectural designs and has funding in place with the goal of seeing the project, which would include a U.S. Coast Guard-approved
navigational light, through to completion in 2015.

References 

Lighthouses in Washington (state)
Transportation buildings and structures in Whatcom County, Washington